1 Dunira Street is an historic building in Comrie, Perth and Kinross, Scotland. It is a Category A listed building dating to 1904. Its architect was Charles Rennie Mackintosh, as part of Honeyman, Keppie and Mackintosh.

A corner building, its prominent feature is its angle turret. As of 1971, its original shop fittings were still in place.

See also
List of Category A listed buildings in Perth and Kinross

References

Category A listed buildings in Perth and Kinross
1904 establishments in Scotland